The 1837 Valdivia earthquake struck south-central Chile on November 7. Together with earthquakes in 1575 and 1737 the earthquake is among the historical predecessors to the great 1960 earthquake. The rupture zone was roughly from Valdivia to the south. It was felt in the cities of Concepción, Valdivia and Ancud. The earthquake was also felt by the crew whaling ships in Guafo Island and Chonos Archipelago. Various landslides were triggered in Chiloé and people are reported to have been thrown to the ground in Valdivia. In contrast in Concepción the shakings were moderate. As reported in various coastal localities the ground rose as result of the earthquake. Decades later while surveying southern Chile's coasts Francisco Vidal Gormaz was told of islands that been submerged and some that had emerged as a consequence of the earthquake. The earthquake caused a tsunami that struck Hawaii, what is now French Polynesia, and Japan. 

In Japan the tsunami flooded rice fields, destroyed salmon traps and broke into salt evaporation ponds causing significant economic losses.

See also
1835 Concepción earthquake
Tenpō famine

Notes

References

Megathrust earthquakes in Chile
Valdivia earthquake
Valdivia earthquake
History of Los Ríos Region
History of Chiloé
1837 tsunamis
Tsunamis in Chile
Tsunamis in Japan
Tsunamis in the United States
November 1837 events
1837 disasters in Chile